Juan José Porta was an Argentine stage and film actor. He appeared in twenty three films during the Golden Age of Argentine Cinema.

Selected filmography
 Modern Husbands (1948)
 The Tango Returns to Paris (1948)
 Juan Mondiola (1950)
 Valentina (1950)
 The Fan (1951)

References

Bibliography 
 Insaurralde, Andrés. Manuel Romero. Centro Editor de América Latina, 1994.

External links 
 

Year of birth unknown
1973 deaths
Argentine male film actors
Argentine male stage actors
People from Buenos Aires